The 2016 United States presidential election in Oregon was held on Tuesday, November 8, 2016, as part of the 2016 United States presidential election in which all 50 states plus the District of Columbia participated. Oregon voters chose electors to represent them in the Electoral College via a popular vote, pitting the Republican Party's nominee, businessman Donald Trump, and running mate Indiana Governor Mike Pence against Democratic Party nominee, former Secretary of State Hillary Clinton, and her running mate Virginia Senator Tim Kaine. Oregon has seven electoral votes in the Electoral College.

The Democratic presidential candidate has won Oregon in every election since 1988. Clinton continued this tradition, carrying the state with 50% of the vote, a slightly reduced margin from Barack Obama in 2012, but with a slightly higher raw vote total, becoming only the second presidential candidate to win more than a million votes in the process. Trump received 39% of the vote, a smaller proportion of the vote compared to that of Mitt Romney in 2012. However, he did achieve a notable feat in carrying Columbia County, becoming the first Republican to do so since Herbert Hoover in 1928. In addition, this was also the first presidential election since 1976 in which Clackamas County backed the losing candidate, with Trump becoming the first Republican ever to win the White House without carrying the county.

Primaries and Caucuses

The incumbent President of the United States, Barack Obama, a Democrat and former U.S. Senator from Illinois, was first elected president in the 2008 election, running with former Senator Joe Biden of Delaware. Defeating the Republican nominee, Senator John McCain of Arizona, with 52.9% of the popular vote and 68% of the electoral vote, Obama succeeded two-term Republican President George W. Bush, the former Governor of Texas. Obama and Biden were reelected in the 2012 presidential election, defeating former Massachusetts Governor Mitt Romney with 51.1% of the popular vote and 61.7% of electoral votes. Although Barack Obama's approval rating in the RealClearPolitics poll tracking average remained between 40% and 50% for most of his second term, it has experienced a surge in early 2016 and reached its highest point since 2012 during June of that year. Analyst Nate Cohn has noted that a strong approval rating for President Obama would equate to a strong performance for the Democratic candidate, and vice versa.

Following his second term, President Obama was not eligible for another reelection. In October 2015, Obama's running-mate and two-term Vice President Biden decided not to enter the race for the Democratic presidential nomination either. With their terms expiring on January 20, 2017, the electorate is asked to elect a new president, the 45th president and 48th vice president of the United States, respectively.

Primary elections

Democratic primary

Two candidates appeared on the Democratic presidential primary ballot:
Bernie Sanders
Hillary Clinton

The 74 delegates from Oregon were allocated in this way. 41 delegates were allocated based on the popular vote in each congressional district with district 2 split (district 2 was split because of its size with district 2a including the northern part of the district and 2b containing the southern part of the district). Another 20 delegates were allocated proportionally based on the statewide popular vote. The state also had 13 super delegates.

Republican primary

Six candidates appeared on the Republican presidential primary ballot:
 Jeb Bush (withdrawn)
 Ben Carson (withdrawn)
 Ted Cruz (withdrawn)
 John Kasich (withdrawn)
 Marco Rubio (withdrawn)
 Donald Trump

The 28 delegates from Oregon were allocated proportionally based on the statewide popular vote.

Green primary
This state's Green Party held its presidential preference vote on May 21.

On May 22, it was announced that Jill Stein had won the preference vote.

Libertarian primary
The Oregon primary was completed on May 27, 2016, the last day to receive mail-in ballots.

Independent Party of Oregon primary
The Independent Party held a primary election on July 18. The party's ballot included Bernie Sanders (D), Hillary Clinton (D), Donald Trump (R), Ted Cruz (R), John Kasich (R), Gary Johnson (L), Jill Stein (G) and a "none of these candidates" choice. 
Bernie Sanders won the primary election with 31.5% of the vote, narrowly defeating Donald Trump's 30.08%. Hillary Clinton came in third, with 24.02% of the vote. Members were allowed to select one or more candidates.

General election

Predictions

Voting History

Besides Lyndon Johnson's landslide victory in 1964, the Republican party's candidate won Oregon in every year from 1948 through 1984. Since then, however, the Democratic candidate has carried the state in every election, including a narrow victory in the 2000 election. The last statewide election won by a Republican candidate was in the 2002 Senate election, all statewide elected officials as of election day were Democrats, and Barack Obama defeated Mitt Romney by 12.09% in the 2012 election. Generally, Eastern Oregon is more conservative, while Western Oregon is more Liberal.

Polling

Democrat Hillary Clinton won every pre-election poll conducted in the state except one and led by margins of 7 to 13 points in most polls. The average of the final 3 polls showed Hillary Clinton leading Trump 44% to 36%.

Results

Hillary Clinton carried the state, lengthening the Democratic streak in Oregon to 8 straight contests.

Results by county

Counties that flipped from Democratic to Republican 
Columbia (largest city: St. Helens)
Tillamook (largest city: Tillamook)

By congressional district
Clinton won 4 of 5 congressional districts.

See also
 United States presidential elections in Oregon
 Presidency of Donald Trump
 2016 Democratic Party presidential debates and forums
 2016 Democratic Party presidential primaries
 2016 Republican Party presidential debates and forums
 2016 Republican Party presidential primaries

References

External links
 RNC 2016 Republican Nominating Process 
 Green papers for 2016 primaries, caucuses, and conventions

Presidential
OR
2016